Rev. Dr. Elbert S. Porter House, also known as "Oakledge," is a historic home located at Claverack in Columbia County, New York.  It was built in 1846, and is a Greek Revival–style residence.  It is a 2-story, three-by-two-bay, side entry frame dwelling with a single-storied square-columned porch spanning the facade.  The 2-story main block is flanked by small single-story wings.

It was added to the National Register of Historic Places in 1997.

References

External links

Houses on the National Register of Historic Places in New York (state)
Greek Revival houses in New York (state)
Houses completed in 1846
Houses in Columbia County, New York
National Register of Historic Places in Columbia County, New York